Stefán Gunnarsson (born 23 April 1951) is an Icelandic former handball player who competed in the 1972 Summer Olympics.

References

1951 births
Living people
Stefan Gunnarsson
Stefan Gunnarsson
Handball players at the 1972 Summer Olympics